Boroujerdi is an Iranian surname referring to the region of Borujerd. Notable people with this name include:

 Seyyed Hossein Borujerdi, (1875-1961) Grand Ayatollah
 Mostafa Boroujerdi, (1962) Ayatollah Doctor
 Hossein Kazemeyni Boroujerdi, Former Ayatollah (also referred to as Mohammad Kazemeini Boroujerdi)
 Mohammad Ali Kazemeini Boroujerdi, Ayatollah, father of Hossein Kazemeyni Boroujerdi
 Alaeddin Boroujerdi, Iranian member of parliament
 Mohammad Boroujerdi, Iranian commander in Iran–Iraq War

See also 
 Borujerdi